Carlos Boix (born June 1949, in Havana, Cuba) is an artist.

Considered a self-taught artist as he had no formal academic training, he uses different art forms, including drawing, painting, ceramics, engraving and graphic design. He worked as an illustrator for the newspaper Juventud Rebelde, Havana, Cuba.
Based in Europe, he has lived in Paris, Stockholm, Algeria, Tunisia, Geneva and, since 2009, in Madrid.

Awards
During his life he has received many awards and honours such as First Prize in Drawing at the Salón Nacional para Artistas Jóvenes, in Museo Nacional de Bellas Artes, Havana, Cuba, 1971 and First Prize in Painting at I Salón Nacional de Pintura y Escultura Carlos Enríquez, Centro de Arte, Havana, Cuba, 1980.

Collections
The principal collections of his work are Casa de las Américas, Havana, Cuba; the Moderna Museet, Stockholm, Sweden; the Museo Nacional de Bellas Artes de La Habana, Cuba; the National Bank of Cuba's offices in London, UK.

Exhibitions

Individual exhibitions 
 2007 Galería de José de Ibarra, Barcelona, Spain
 2007 Deutscher Ring, Hamburg, Germany
 2005 Galeria Sonia Zannettacci, Geneva, Switzerland
 2005 Artevie, Abbaye de Cercanceaux, Souppes sur Loing, France
 2004 Modern Art Gallery Studio f.22, Palazzolo s/O, Italy
 2002 Eskilstuna Konstmuseum, Eskilstuna, Sweden
 2002 Monasterio de San Francisco, Havana, Cuba
 2002 Galeria Sonia Zannettacci, Geneva, Switzerland
 2001 Dalarnas Museum, Falun, Sweden
 2000 Modern Art Gallery Studio f.22, Palazzolo s/O, Italy
 1999 Salon Art Open, Essen, Germany
 1999 Galerie Cherif Fine Art, La Marsa, Tunisia
 1998 Galerie Arte Monaco, Monte Carlo, Monaco
 1996 Galerie Art Présent, Paris, France
 1995 Galerie Editart, Geneva, Switzerland
 1994 Moderne Art Gallery Studio f.22, Palazzolo s/O, Italy
 1994 Galleria Severgnini, Cernusco-Milano, Italy
 1993 Galerie L'Orangerie, Neuchâtel, Switzerland
 1992 Centre d'Art en l'Ile, Geneva, Switzerland
 1992 Galleria Severgnini, Cernusco-Milano, Italy
 1991 Galleria Linea 70, Verona, Italy
 1991 Galleria de Clemente, Brescia, Italy
 1990 Modern Art Gallery Studio f.22, Palazzolo s/O, Italy
 1990 Galleria Rinaldo Rotta, Genua, Italy
 1988 Galerie L'Oeil du Boeuf, Paris, France
 1984 Konstfrämjandet, Stockholm, Sweden
 1983 Latinamerikanska institutet, Stockholm, Sweden
 1980 Museo de Artes Decorativas, Havana, Cuba
 1980 Fundación Wifredo Lam, Havana, Cuba
 1979 Galería de la UNEAC, Havana, Cuba
 1979 Galería de Plaza, Havana, Cuba
 1979 Konstfrämjandet, Stockholm, Sweden
 1975 Prensa Latina, Havana, Cuba

Collective exhibitions

 2006 Art en Capital, Grand Palais, Paris, France
 2003 Modern Art Gallery Studio f.22, Palazzolo s/O, Italy
 2001 Galerie Reinhold Ketelbutere, Bruxelles, Belgium
 1997 Galleria Artistudio, Milano, Italy
 1997 Galleria del Rigoletto, Milano, Italy
 1996 Salon de Mai, Paris, France
 1996 Galleria Severgnini, Cernusco-Milan, Italy
 1995 Galerie Editart, Geneva, Switzerland
 1995 Salon Comparaisons, Paris, France
 1995 Salon de Mai, Paris, France
 1995 Grands et jeunes d'aujourd'hui, Paris, France
 1994 Modern Art Gallery Studio f.22, Palazzolo s/O, Italy
 1994 Galleria Severgnini, Cernusco-Milano, Italy
 1993 Galerie de l'Orangerie, Neuchâtel, Switzerland
 1991 Art Gallery Pewny, Geneva, Switzerland
 1991 Galerie Editart, Geneva, Switzerland
 1991 Institut National Genevois, Geneva, Switzerland
 1990 Galerie Editart, Geneva, Switzerland
 1990 Salon Comparaisons, Paris, France
 1990 Espacio Latinoamericano, Paris, France
 1990 Modern Art Gallery Studio f.22, Palazzolo s/O, Italy
 1988 Espacio Latinoamericano, Paris, France
 1984 Bienal Internacional de La Habana, Cuba

External links
 Boix web site
 Galeria Jose de Ibarra
 List of Cuban artists
 List of contemporary Cuban painters
 Latin American art

References

Cuban contemporary artists
1949 births
Living people
Artists from Havana